Jimmy Clairet (born 20 December 1990) is a French racing driver currently competing in the TCR International Series. Having previously competed in the French Renault Clio Cup & French Peugeot 208 Racing Cup.

Racing career
Clairet began his career in 2013 in the French Peugeot 208 Racing Cup, he raced there up until 2014 and finished 2nd in the championship standings that year. He switched to the French Renault Clio Cup for 2015, taking a single victory on his way to finish 6th in the standings. He stayed in the championship for 2016.

In April 2016 it was announced that he would race in the TCR International Series, driving a Peugeot 308 Racing Cup for Sébastien Loeb Racing.

Racing record

Complete TCR International Series results
(key) (Races in bold indicate pole position) (Races in italics indicate fastest lap)

Complete TCR Europe Touring Car Series results
(key) (Races in bold indicate pole position) (Races in italics indicate fastest lap)

† Driver did not finish the race, but was classified as he completed over 90% of the race distance.

References

External links
 
Official website
 

1990 births
Living people
TCR International Series drivers
Racing drivers from Paris
French racing drivers
24H Series drivers
TCR Europe Touring Car Series drivers